Around the Pink House ( / ) is a 1999 film co-directed by Joana Hadjithomas and Khalil Joreige. It was an international co-production between France, Canada and Lebanon. It was Lebanon's official Best Foreign Language Film submission at the 72nd Academy Awards, but did not manage to receive a nomination.

Cast

References

External links

Canadian drama films
Lebanese drama films
1990s French-language films
1990s Arabic-language films
1999 films
French drama films
1999 multilingual films
Canadian multilingual films
French multilingual films
Lebanese multilingual films
French-language Canadian films
Arabic-language Canadian films
1990s Canadian films
1990s French films